The Reserva Provincial Castillos de Pincheira is a natural area protected in Argentina. It's located about 27 km to the west of the Malargüe city in the southern part of the Mendoza Province.

It is a natural monument sculpted by erosive actions, mainly of glaciers. Its form is very similar to a giant castle, in the front flow the Malargüe River and very near the Pincheira Stream.

According to the legend, this site was a refuge for the Chilean bandits called Pincheira brothers, during the beginning of the 20th century. Around of the natural monument there are many arrows tips of the Huarpes, an ancient ethnic group who inhabited the zone.

External links
 Complejo Castillos de Pincheira
 Castillos de Pincheira description and video

Protected areas of Mendoza Province
Castillos de Pincheira
Castillos de Pincheira
Indigenous topics of the Southern Cone